Joe Navarro (born June 25, 1972) is an American basketball  head coach for the Tokyo Cinq Rêves of the Japanese B.League.

Head coaching record

 
|-
| style="text-align:left;"|Hiroshima Lightning
| style="text-align:left;"|2015-16
|48||1||47|||| style="text-align:center;"|12th in Western|||-||-||-||
| style="text-align:center;"|-

|-
| style="text-align:left;"|Kagawa Five Arrows
| style="text-align:left;"|2016-17
|60||19||41|||| style="text-align:center;"|5th in B2 Western|||-||-||-||
| style="text-align:center;"|-
|-
| style="text-align:left;"|Tokyo Cinq Rêves
| style="text-align:left;"|2017-18
|42||6||36|||| style="text-align:center;"|8th in B3|||20||2||18||
| style="text-align:center;"|6th in Final stage
|-
|-

References

1972 births
Living people
American expatriate basketball people in Japan
American men's basketball coaches
American men's basketball players
Concordia Cavaliers men's basketball players
High school basketball coaches in the United States
Kagawa Five Arrows coaches
Point guards
Tokyo Cinq Rêves coaches